Holdfast is a civil parish in the Malvern Hills District of the county of Worcestershire, England. It is one of three administered by the Parish Council of Longdon, Queenhill and Holdfast. It lies on the west bank of the River Severn immediately to the south of Upton upon Severn.

References

Hamlets in Worcestershire
Civil parishes in Worcestershire
Malvern Hills District